Olea rubrovenia is a woody plant in the Olive genus Olea. The plant is native to Borneo and the Philippines.

Description
The bark is whitish.

The specific epithet rubrovenia is from the Latin meaning "red veins", referring to the leaf veins.

The fragrant flowers are creamy white or greenish yellow.

The fruit ripens into a purple-black olive.

References

rubrovenia
Flora of Borneo
Flora of the Philippines
Plants described in 1909